Randall Ray Rader (born April 21, 1949) is a former United States Circuit Judge and former Chief Judge of the United States Court of Appeals for the Federal Circuit.

Early life, education, and career

Born in Hastings, Nebraska, Rader received a Bachelor of Arts degree in English from Brigham Young University in 1974 and a Juris Doctor from the George Washington University Law School in 1978. Rader served in staff positions on the United States House of Representatives from 1975 to 1980, first as a legislative assistant to United States Representative Virginia D. Smith from 1975 to 1978, then as counsel to United States Representative Philip Crane, and legislative director of the United States House Committee on Ways and Means from 1978 to 1981. He then served as counsel to the United States Senate Committee on the Judiciary from 1980 to 1988. While counsel to the Judiciary Committee, he was Chief Counsel or Minority Chief Counsel for the Subcommittee on the Constitution and the Subcommittee on Patents, Trademarks, and Copyrights.

Federal judicial service

President Ronald Reagan appointed Rader to the United States Court of Federal Claims in 1988, to succeed Robert M. M. Seto. The United States Senate confirmed the nomination by unanimous consent on August 11, 1988. On June 12, 1990, Rader was nominated by President George H. W. Bush to a seat on the United States Court of Appeals for the Federal Circuit vacated by Judge Jean Galloway Bissell. Rader was confirmed by the Senate on August 3, 1990, and received his commission on August 9, 1990.

While on the Federal Circuit, Rader has served as a law professor, having taught patent law and advanced intellectual property courses at the University of Virginia School of Law, Georgetown University Law Center, Washington, DC, the Munich Intellectual Property Law Center, and the George Washington University Law School, Washington, D.C.  Rader is co-author of a casebook on patent law used at over sixty-five law schools. He has received many awards, including the J. William Fulbright Award for Distinguished Public Service, 2000. As an appellate judge, Rader has also led or participated in over sixty delegations to foreign nations, usually to teach rule of law or intellectual property concepts in developing nations.

In 2010, Rader became Chief Judge of the Federal Circuit succeeding Chief Judge Paul Redmond Michel upon his retirement. Along with his new administrative duties, he continued to speak at law schools and at international conferences.

On May 23, 2014, Rader announced his resignation as Chief Judge effective May 30, 2014. Rader remained a judge on the court, and Judge Sharon Prost succeeded him as Chief Judge. On June 13, 2014, Rader announced his retirement from the court effective June 30, 2014. Rader is on the Board of the International IP Commercialization Council (IIPCC.org), a global NPO NGO.

Breach of an ethical obligation

Rader's resignation as Chief Judge and his announcement of retirement came in the wake of his admitted breach of an ethical obligation to not lend the prestige of the judicial office to advance the private interests of others. Rader had sent a laudatory e-mail to a member of the bar of the Federal Circuit and asked that member to show that e-mail to other members of the Bar. Rader also recused himself from a couple of cases he had presided over, due to the participation of the attorney in question.

Works and publications

References

External links

Interview with Randall Rader by Matthew J. Dowd
Rader's letter of resignation as Chief Judge, May 23, 2014

1949 births
Living people
American Latter Day Saints
American legal scholars
Brigham Young University alumni
George Washington University Law School alumni
Judges of the United States Court of Appeals for the Federal Circuit
Judges of the United States Court of Federal Claims
United States Article I federal judges appointed by Ronald Reagan
20th-century American judges
United States court of appeals judges appointed by George H. W. Bush
University of Virginia School of Law faculty